Herman Thomas Davis Jr. (March 21, 1939 – April 3, 2022) was an American professional baseball player and coach. He played in Major League Baseball as a left fielder and third baseman from 1959 to 1976 for ten different teams, most prominently for the Los Angeles Dodgers where he was a two-time National League batting champion and was a member of the 1963 World Series winning team.

During an 18-year baseball career, Davis batted .294 with 153 home runs, 2,121 hits and 1,052 runs batted in (RBI) in 1,999 career games. He was also a talented pinch hitter, batting .307 (62-for-202) in his career. In 1962, he finished third in the MVP voting after leading the major leagues in batting average, hits and runs batted in. Davis' 153 RBIs in that season broke Roy Campanella's team record of 142 in 1953 and remains the franchise record; his 230 hits are the team record for a right-handed batter (second most in franchise history behind only Babe Herman's 241 in 1930), and his .346 average was the highest by a Dodgers right-handed hitter in the 20th century until it was broken by Mike Piazza in 1997 with .362.

Baseball career

Early career
Davis was born in Brooklyn, New York and grew up in the borough's Bedford–Stuyvesant neighborhood. He attended Boys High School in Brooklyn, where he was a basketball teammate of future Basketball Hall of Famer Lenny Wilkens and played for coach Mickey Fisher, as well as a long jumper on the school's track and field team with record breaker Bernard Lowther. In 1956, he was considering signing with the New York Yankees, but received a phone call from Jackie Robinson who convinced him to sign with the Brooklyn Dodgers instead.  In his minor league career, he won batting titles in the Midwest League and Pacific Coast League.

Los Angeles Dodgers

By the time Davis made the majors, the Dodgers had moved to Los Angeles; he debuted with a pinch-hitting appearance on September 22, 1959. He batted .276 in his 1960 rookie season, and .278 in 1961, before enjoying his breakout year in 1962 as the team moved into the new Dodger Stadium. His .346 batting average edged out Frank Robinson's .342 for the National League batting crown, and his 230 hits and 153 RBI led the major leagues. His 230 hits in 1962 were the most in a season by any player between 1937 and 1969, while his 153 RBI, a franchise record, was the highest total reached between 1949 and 1998. He also had career bests with 27 home runs, 120 runs, and nine triples as the Dodgers finished the regular schedule tied for first place with the San Francisco Giants, but lost a three-game playoff. He finished third in the MVP balloting, with teammate Maury Wills winning the award and Willie Mays finishing second.

In 1963, Davis won his second batting title, edging Roberto Clemente by six points, and finished eighth in the MVP balloting. In the 1963 World Series, the Dodgers swept the New York Yankees; batting cleanup, Davis hit .400 in the Series, tripling twice in Game 2 and driving in the only run of the 1–0 Game 3 victory, his first-inning single off Jim Bouton driving in Jim Gilliam.

To date, Davis' back-to-back batting titles are the only two in the Dodgers' Los Angeles history. Only two right-handed hitters have won multiple National League batting titles since: Bill Madlock with four, and Roberto Clemente with four. Davis won the batting titles while playing his home games at Dodger Stadium—one of Major League Baseball's less hitter-friendly parks.

Davis slumped to .275 in 1964 as the Dodgers finished out of contention for the pennant. On May 1, 1965, against the visiting Giants, he broke and dislocated his ankle sliding into second base while trying to break up a double play and was lost for the remainder of the season, although he did pinch-hit on the final day of the regular season. Three days later, the Dodgers called up Lou Johnson to replace him. The Dodgers won the World Series that year, defeating the Minnesota Twins in seven games. Davis rebounded in 1966, batting .313 in 100 games, but he hit just three home runs and recorded 27 RBI in 313 at bats. Los Angeles was swept by the Baltimore Orioles in the World Series, with Davis starting only two of the four games and batting .250.

10 teams in 10 years
On November 29, 1966, Davis was traded to the New York Mets along with Derrell Griffith in exchange for Ron Hunt and Jim Hickman. He batted .302 with 16 home runs and 73 RBI in 154 games during the 1967 season. On December 15, 1967, Davis was traded again, this time to the Chicago White Sox in a six-player deal, with the Mets acquiring Tommie Agee and Al Weis—two men who would play major roles in the Miracle Mets winning the 1969 World Series. In 1968, in what would become the "Year of the Pitcher", Davis led the White Sox in hitting with a .268 average, and posted eight home runs and 50 RBI in 132 games. Teammate Tommy John felt the trade was a mistake because the White Sox at that time were based more on defense and speed, neither of which was Davis's strong point.

In October 1968, Davis was selected by the Seattle Pilots in the expansion draft. During the 1969 season, he batted .271 with six home runs and 80 RBI in 123 games with the Pilots before being traded to the Houston Astros, where he hit .241 with a home run and 9 RBI; his 20 stolen bases that year were a career high. He began 1970 with Houston, hitting .282 with three home runs and 30 RBI in 57 games before his contract was sold to the Oakland Athletics in June; he hit .290 with a home run and 27 RBI in 66 games with the A's before being sent to the Chicago Cubs for the last two weeks of the season. The Cubs released him in December, and he re-signed with the A's as a free agent, rebounding with a .324 campaign, three home runs and 42 RBI in 79 games in 1971. However, Oakland released him at the end of 1972 spring training; he signed with the Cubs again in July, but played only a month before being traded to the Baltimore Orioles, where he would spend the next three seasons. In Baltimore, he served as the designated hitter from 1973 to 1975, finishing third in the 1973 batting race with a .306 mark and placing tenth in the MVP vote. Then in 1974, he was second in the American League with 181 hits. Also in 1974, he won the Outstanding Designated Hitter Award (later renamed for Edgar Martínez). He played in two American League Championship Series (both times, in 1973 and 1974, the Orioles lost to the eventual World Series champion Oakland Athletics). The Orioles released him in 1976 spring training, and he signed with the Yankees but did not play for them. From June to September he hit .265 with three home runs and 26 RBI in 72 games with the California Angels before ending the season with the Kansas City Royals. He retired after being released by the Royals on January 17, 1977, having played for ten different teams in eighteen seasons. He occasionally expressed resentment for his numerous moves, remarking late in his career: "I'm very bitter, bitter as hell. Why do I keep getting released? Don't ask me no reason why." But he conceded his reputation as having a casual style of play, noting, "the lazier I felt the better I hit", and admitting that he often went into the clubhouse to read and even to shave between at bats as a DH with Baltimore. After his retirement from baseball as a player, he served as a Seattle Mariners coach in 1981.

See also
 List of Major League Baseball batting champions
 List of Major League Baseball career runs batted in leaders
 List of Major League Baseball annual runs batted in leaders
 List of Major League Baseball career hits leaders

References

Further reading
Baseball: The Biographical Encyclopedia (2000). Kingston, New York: Total/Sports Illustrated. .

External links
 
 Official Tommy Davis website

1939 births
2022 deaths
African-American baseball players
Baltimore Orioles players
California Angels players
Chicago Cubs players
Chicago White Sox players
Houston Astros players
Kansas City Royals players
Los Angeles Dodgers players
Kokomo Dodgers players
Major League Baseball designated hitters
Major League Baseball left fielders
National League All-Stars
National League batting champions
National League RBI champions
New York Mets players
Oakland Athletics players
People from Bedford–Stuyvesant, Brooklyn
Sportspeople from Brooklyn
Baseball players from New York City
Seattle Pilots players
Spokane Indians players
Los Angeles Dodgers Legend Bureau
Hornell Dodgers players
Montreal Royals players
Victoria Rosebuds players
Gulf Coast Cubs players
Seattle Mariners coaches
Boys High School (Brooklyn) alumni
21st-century African-American people
20th-century African-American sportspeople